The Ministry of Information and Communication Technology (MICT) is a department of the Namibian government. It was established in 1990 as Ministry of Information and Broadcasting, responsible for licensing of the media, the first minister was Hidipo Hamutenya.

The ministry was disbanded in 2000; Its portfolio was added to the foreign ministry. In 2003 it was reestablished under its original name, and in 2008 it gained the communication portfolio from the Ministry of Works and Transport. Since then it carries its  name. The  minister is Peya Mushelenga.

Ministers
All information ministers in chronological order are:

See also
 Telecommunications in Namibia
 Mass media in Namibia
 Communications Regulatory Authority of Namibia

References

External links
Official website Ministry of Information and Communication Technology

Information
Information
Mass media in Namibia
1990 establishments in Namibia
2000 disestablishments in Namibia
2003 establishments in Namibia